John Cornelius alias Cornellys alias Johnson alias Welbored (died 1567), was an English politician.

He was a Member (MP) of the Parliament of England for Weymouth in 1547.

References

Year of birth missing
1567 deaths
English MPs 1547–1552